Enoch Lewis may refer to:
 Enoch Lewis (cricketer)
 Enoch Lewis (mathematician)